Japanese-based creole languages or simply Japanese Creoles are creole languages for which Japanese is the lexifier. This article also contains information on Japanese pidgin languages, contact languages that lack native speakers.

List 
Some important Japanese creoles and pidgins are the following:

Japanese has also made a significant contribution to other pidgins and creoles: to Ogasawara Creole, with an English-based lexicon, spoken in Ogasawara Islands, to the Chinese-based Xieheyu spoken in Manchukuo, to the Bamboo English of occupied Japan, and to the Hawaiian Pidgin which became a creole spoken in Hawaii.

See also 

 Dutch based creole languages
 Spanish based creole languages
 English based creole languages

References

Pidgins and creoles
Japanese-based pidgins and creoles
Japanese language